The 2009–10 All-Ireland Intermediate Club Hurling Championship was the sixth staging of the All-Ireland Intermediate Club Hurling Championship since its establishment by the Gaelic Athletic Association in 2004.

The All-Ireland final was played on 13 February 2010 at Croke Park in Dublin, between St. Lachtain's from Kilkenny and St. Gall's from Antrim. St. Lachtain's won the match by 3-17 to 0-10 to claim their first ever All-Ireland title.

Results

Leinster Intermediate Club Hurling Championship

Final

Munster Intermediate Club Hurling Championship

Quarter-finals

Semi-finals

Final

All-Ireland Intermediate Club Hurling Championship

Final

References

All-Ireland Intermediate Club Hurling Championship
All-Ireland Intermediate Club Hurling Championship
All-Ireland Intermediate Club Hurling Championship